Francisco Soto de Langa (Langa de Duero, 1534 — Rome, 1619) was a singer, editor and composer. A minor exponent of the lauda and priest of the Congregation of the Oratory where he was affiliated with St. Fillippo Neri and Giovanni Animuccia. Soto de Langa was tenured at the papal choir in Rome from 1562 until his retirement in 1611. Reputedly the first castrato to enter into the Papal Chapel, Langa had an instrumental role in the posthumous preservation of Juan Navarro's Psalmi, Hymni ac Magnificat totius Anni. A significant collection of laudi spirituali is extant, of which only a mere handful can be assigned to de Langa with any degree of certainty. Bold vertical harmonies and symmetrically balanced phrases are among his stylistic traits.

Recordings
Nuove Laudi Ariose della Beatissima Vergine - Tactus, 2001. Progetto Musica, conducted by Giulio Monaco

References

1534 births
1619 deaths
Castrati
16th-century Italian composers
17th-century Italian composers
Italian male composers
17th-century male musicians